The 2008 NESTEA European Championship Tour (or the 2008 European Beach Volleyball Tour) is a European beach volleyball tour.

The tour consists of seven tournaments with both genders, including the 2008 Championship Final.

Tournaments
Spanish Masters, in Gran Canaria, Spain - 17–20 April 2008
Austrian Masters, in St. Pölten, Austria - 9–12 May 2008
Swiss Masters, in Lucerne, Switzerland - 22–25 May 2008
Dutch Masters, in The Hague, Netherlands - 29 May - 1 June 2008
2008 Nestea European Championship Final, in Hamburg, Germany - 10–13 July 2008
English Masters, in Blackpool, England - 11–14 September 2008
Masters Final, in Sochi, Russia - 19–21 September 2008

Tournament results

Women

Men

Medal table

References

 

European
Nestea European Championship Tour